Daiyue is a district of the city of Tai'an in Shandong province, China.

Administrative divisions
As 2012, this district is divided to 2 subdistricts, 14 towns and 2 townships.
Subdistricts
Zhoudian Subdistrict
Tianping Subdistrict

Towns

Townships
Xiagang Township
Huamawan Township

References

External links 
 Information page

County-level divisions of Shandong
Tai'an